Chit Yay Sin, is a 1940 Burmese black-and-white drama film, directed by Tin Maung starring Tin Maung and May Shin.

Cast
Tin Maung as Phone Myint
May Shin as Nyo Nyo
Thar Gaung as Pan Thway
Saing Tin as Saing Tin
Ba Shin as U Ba Shin
Bo Thaung as U Bo Thaung

References

1940 films
Burmese-language films
Films shot in Myanmar
Burmese black-and-white films